The 2008 Tri Nations Series was the thirteenth annual Tri Nations competition between the national rugby union teams of New Zealand, Australia and South Africa. The All Blacks won the series on 13 September 2008 after defeating Australia in the last match of the series.

Background 
This was the first Tri Nations tournament after South Africa's 2007 Rugby World Cup victory, and they went into the competition as the top team in the IRB World Rankings (having ended a 175-week run for New Zealand). On 30 June 2008, before the tournament began, New Zealand and Australia were ranked second and third in the world respectively.

The All Blacks went into the series with a world record 29 successive home victories, and South Africa with a 13 match winning streak.

By the end of the tournament New Zealand had retaken top place in the IRB World Rankings. After 26 weeks at number one, South Africa slipped to second. Australia remained third.

The final match of the Bledisloe Cup series between Australia and New Zealand took place after the Tri-Nations, on 1 November (the first 3 matches of the series were part of the Tri-Nations).

Experimental Law Variations 

Several of the sport's Experimental Law Variations (or ELVs) were trialled as part of the 2008 Tri Nations. A global trial of 13 ELVs at all levels is to be conducted for one year from 1 August 2008. The Tri Nation's governing body SANZAR approved the trial of all the ELVs that had been included in the 2008 Super 14 season, as well as the ELVs to be trialled globally. Statistics from the 2008 Super 14 revealed the ELVs increased the number of tries, reduced the number of line-outs and penalties, increased the number of free kicks, but did not change the number of scrums or mauls. The changes increased the attacking opportunities from scrums.

Standings

Fixtures

The Springboks get their first win over the All Blacks at Carisbrook, and their first win in New Zealand since 1998

 This match saw two players reach major milestones:
 Dan Carter became the ninth player in history with 800 Test points.
 Percy Montgomery became the ninth player in history to earn his 100th Test cap.

References

External links 
 All Blacks Tri Nations website
 
 Wallabies Tri Nations website

2008
2008 in South African rugby union
2008 in New Zealand rugby union
2008 in Australian rugby union
2008 rugby union tournaments for national teams